This is an alphabetical list of notable Mexican Actresses.

A 

 Chantal Andere
 Jacqueline Andere
 Yolanda Andrade
 Yalitza Aparicio
 Angélica Aragón
Lilia Aragón
 Aracely Arámbula
Socorro Avelar

B 

 Nuria Bages
 Rocío Banquells
 Angelique Boyer
 Jacqueline Bracamontes
 Diana Bracho
 Erika Buenfil

C 

 Leticia Calderón
 Itatí Cantoral
 Irán Castillo
 Daniela Castro
Martha Mariana Castro
 Verónica Castro
Ana Colchero
 Ninel Conde
 Ana Brenda Contreras
 Claudia Alvarez Ocampo

D 

 Kate del Castillo

E 

 Kika Edgar
 Julieta Egurrola
Ana Bertha Espín

F 

Virginia Fábregas
 María Félix
 Laura Flores
 Adriana Fonseca

G 

 Bibi Gaytán
 Edith González
 Eiza González
 Susana González

H 

 Salma Hayek
 Lorena Herrera

I 
 Claudia Islas
 Giselle Itié

J 

 Altair Jarabo

K

L 

 Emma Laura
Adriana Lavat
 Andrea Legarreta
 Laura Leon
 Karyme Lozano
 Lucero
 Lety López

M 

 Patricia Manterola
 Angelica Maria
 Ana Martín
 Lucía Méndez
 Galilea Montijo
Lisette Morelos

N 

 Silvia Navarro
 Patricia Navidad
 Adriana Nieto
 Adela Noriega
 Nailea Norvind
Renata Notni
 Lupita Nyong'o

O

P 

 Dominika Paleta
 Ludwika Paleta
Leticia Palma
 Maite Perroni
 Silvia Pasquel
 Christina Pastor

Q

R 

 Patricia Reyes Spíndola
 Angélica Rivera
 Lorena Rojas
 Ana Patricia Rojo
 Helena Rojo
 María Rojo
 Daniela Romo
 Victoria Ruffo

S 

Susana Salazar
Carmen Salinas
 Nora Salinas
 Blanca Sánchez
 Mariana Seoane
 Sherlyn
Sofía Sisniega
 Stephanie Sigman
 Sasha Sokol
 María Sorté

T 
Arleth Terán
 Thalía

U

V 

 Angelica Vale
 Zuria Vega
 Michelle Vieth
 Mayrín Villanueva
Grettell Valdéz

W

X

Y

Z 
 Laura Zapata

Lists of actresses
Lists of actors by nationality
Lists of Mexican women
Actresses